Cecil Patteson Nickalls, D.S.O. (14 October 1877 – 7 April 1925) was a Colonel in the Royal Field Artillery. He was a champion polo player, and a champion rugby player, who killed himself with a gun on 7 April 1925.

Early life
He was born on 14 October 1877 in Kent, England to Sir Patteson Nickalls. His siblings were, Patteson Womersley Nickalls and Morres Nickalls.  He was educated at Rugby School.

Career
In the 1890s he played cricket. He scored 109 at Lord's Cricket Ground against Marlborough for  Rugby in 1894.

He was on the British team that won the International Polo Cup at the Hurlingham Club in 1902 with his brother Patteson Womersley Nickalls, Frederick Maitland Freake, Walter Selby Buckmaster, George Arthur Miller and Charles Darley Miller. He played on the English team against Ireland in 1905 and 1911.

He served as a captain in the Royal Field Artillery in World War I.  He was awarded the DSO and wounded.

Personal life
He married Olivia Mary Miller in 1904 in Rugby, England.

Death
Nickalls committed suicide with a gun on 7 April 1925 in Rugby, England.

References

External links

1877 births
1925 deaths
1925 suicides
Rugby union players from Kent
English polo players
English rugby union players
Suicides by firearm in England
International Polo Cup
Royal Field Artillery officers
Companions of the Distinguished Service Order
British military personnel who committed suicide
British Army personnel of World War I
Military personnel from Kent
Nickalls family